Joe Brainard (March 11, 1942 – May 25, 1994) was an American artist and writer associated with the New York School. His prodigious and innovative body of work included assemblages, collages, drawing, and painting, as well as designs for book and album covers, theatrical sets and costumes. In particular, Brainard broke new ground in using comics as a poetic medium in his collaborations with other New York School poets. He is best known for his memoir I Remember, of which Paul Auster said: "It is ... one of the few totally original books I have ever read."

Life
Joe Brainard was born on March 11, 1942, in Salem, Arkansas, and spent his childhood in Tulsa, Oklahoma. He is the brother of painter John Brainard.

Brainard became friends with Ron Padgett, Dick Gallup, and Ted Berrigan during high school while working on the literary journal The White Dove Review, which was printed five times during 1959/1960. The 18-year-old Brainard joined the journal as its art editor after fellow Central High classmate Padgett sent Brainard an anonymous Christmas card praising his work.

After high school, the artist re-united with the White Dove boys in New York City shortly after leaving the Dayton Art Institute.

By 1964, Brainard had already had his first solo exhibition and was ensconced in a circle of friends that included Frank O'Hara, Kenneth Koch, Alex Katz, Edwin Denby, Larry Rivers, Fairfield Porter, James Schuyler, Jane Freilicher, Virgil Thomson, John Ashbery, among many others. He also began a relationship with Kenward Elmslie which lasted much of his life, despite having other lovers. He found much success as an artist, until he removed himself from the art-world in the early 1980s. He devoted the last years of his life to reading.

Brainard died of AIDS-induced pneumonia on May 25, 1994.

Works

Visual and literary work 
Brainard began his career during the early Pop Art era, and while his work has a certain affinity with Pop Art, it does not fit the definition of the genre:

The inimitability of Brainard's work is located partly in its resistance to categorization, in its breadth, and in its rapport with and awe of the quotidian:

Particularly in the collages, drawings and small works on paper, Brainard transformed the everyday into something revelatory:

I Remember 

Joe Brainard's I Remember radically departs from the conventions of the traditional memoir.  His deft juxtapositions of the banal with the revelatory, the very particular with the apparently universal accumulate into a complex depiction of his childhood in the 1940s and '50s in Oklahoma as well as his life in the '60s and '70s in New York City. I Remember has inspired many homages and adaptations.

Publications

 I Remember (Angel Hair, 1970)
 I Remember More (Angel Hair, 1972)
 More I Remember More (Angel Hair, 1973)
 I Remember Christmas (Museum of Modern Art, 1973)
 I Remember (first collected edition, Full Court Press, 1975)
 I Remember (new edition, Penguin, 1995)
 I Remember (new edition, Granary Books, 2001, 4th printing 2005)
 Selected Writings (Kulchur, 1971)
 Bolinas Journal (Big Sky, 1971)
 Some Drawings of Some Notes to Myself (Siamese Banana, 1971)
 The Cigarette Book (Siamese Banana, 1972)
 The Banana Book (Siamese Banana, 1972)
 The Friendly Way (Siamese Banana, 1972)
 New Work (Black Sparrow, 1973)
 12 Postcards (Z Press, 1975)
 29 Mini-Essays (Z Press, 1978)
 24 Pictures & Some Words (BLT, 1980)
 Nothing to Write Home About (Little Caesar, 1981)
 Ten Imaginary Still Lifes (Boke Press, 1995)
 The Nancy Book (Siglio Press, 2008) 
 The Collected Writings of Joe Brainard (Library of America, 2012)

Collaborative work
 Some Things (C Press, New York, 1964), with Ron Padgett and Ted Berrigan
 The Baby Book (Boke Press, 1965), with Kenward Elmslie
 Bean Spasms (Kulchur, 1967) with Ted Berrigan and Ron Padgett
 The 1967 Game Calendar (Boke Press, 1967), with Kenward Elmslie
 100,000 Fleeing Hilda (Boke Press, 1967), with Ron Padgett
 The Drunken Boat (privately printed, nd), with Ted Berrigan
 The Champ (Black Sparrow, 1968), with Kenward Elmslie
 Album (Kulchur, 1969), with Kenward Elmslie
 Recent Visitors (Best & Co./Boke Press, 1971), with Bill Berkson
 Neil Young (The Coach House Press, 1971), with Tom Clark
 Sufferin' Succotash/Kiss My Ass (Adventures in Poetry, 1971), with Ron Padgett/Michael Brownstein)
 Self-Portrait (Siamese Banana, 1972) with Anne Waldman
 Shiny Ride (Boke Press, 1972), with Kenward Elmslie
 The Class of '47 (Bouwerie Editions, 1973; SUNY Buffalo Art Gallery, 2007), with Robert Creeley
 The Vermont Notebook (1975), with John Ashbery
 I Love You, de Kooning (Bolinas, Calif.: Yanagi Broadside late 1970s), with Bill Berkson
 1984 Comics (Marz Verlag, 1983), collaborations with Bill Berkson, Ted Berrigan, Michael Brownstein, Kenward Elmslie, Larry Fagin, Barbara Guest, Kenneth Koch, Harry Mathews, Frank O'Hara, Ron Padgett, Peter Schjeldahl, James Schuyler, and Tony Towle
 Sung Sex (Kulchur, 1989), with Kenward Elmslie
 Pay Dirt (Bamberger Books, 1992), with Kenward Elmslie

Solo exhibitions

Selected Collections include Berkeley Art Museum, Chase Manhattan Bank, Baron Guy de Rothschild, Fogg Museum, Harvard; Metropolitan Museum of Art, Museum of Modern Art, Rhode Island School of Design Art Museum, Time-Life, Inc,. Whitney Museum of American Art, among others. The Mandeville Special Collections Library at UCSD also has a large archive of works by and about Brainard collected by Robert Butts from 1960 to 1992.

His work in theater included set designs for Frank O'Hara's The General Returns from One Place to Another and LeRoi Jones's The Baptism. Brainard also did sets and costumes for the Louis Falco Dance Troupe and the Joffrey Ballet Company.

Notes

External links
 Official Website of Joe Brainard 
 I Remember Joe Brainard  (2012; video remembrances by Bill Berkson, Brad Gooch, Robert Pinsky, Edmund White, and others) 

1942 births
1994 deaths
American artists
American gay writers
LGBT people from Arkansas
LGBT people from Oklahoma
American gay artists
New York School poets
Writers from New York (state)
AIDS-related deaths in New York (state)
People from Greenwich Village
American LGBT poets
20th-century American poets
American male poets
20th-century American male writers
20th-century American LGBT people
Gay poets